Salacieli Naivilawasa (born 14 February 1961 in Ra) is a Fijian former rugby union footballer, he played as hooker.

Career
His first international match was against Tonga, at Nuku'alofa, on 28 June 1986. He was also part of the 1987 Rugby World Cup Fijian squad, playing 3 matches, scoring a try in the pool match against Argentina at Hamilton, on 24 May. He also was in the 1991 Rugby World Cup roster, where he played only the match against Canada on 5 October 1991, the last match for the Flying Fijians in his career.

After career
Currently he works in the Fiji Police Force as Divisional Police Commander and senior superintendent in the Western Division. He joined the force as an 18-year-old straight out of Xavier College and began his career at the Valelevu base in Suva, before transferring to the mobile unit and then to Sigatoka.

Notes

External links
 

Fiji international rugby union players
Fijian rugby union players
Rugby union hookers
People from Ra Province
1961 births
Living people
I-Taukei Fijian people